Wayne Pullen (born 27 February 1945) is a Canadian archer. He competed in the men's individual event at the 1972 Summer Olympics.

References

1945 births
Living people
Canadian male archers
Olympic archers of Canada
Archers at the 1972 Summer Olympics
Sportspeople from Vancouver
20th-century Canadian people